The Bailey House was built in 1889, and was designed by William A. Lang.  The Bailey House, built for a Mr. G.W. Bailey, is the largest of William Lang's surviving residential residences.  William A. Lang (1846–1897) was a Denver architect who was active from 1885 to 1893.

The Bailey House is Queen Anne style with a corner tower and a pinwheel plan. The house also has many Richardsonian Romanesque elements, especially in the materials and details.

References

External links
Bailey House (Archiplanet)
Bailey House (Colorado State Historical Society)

Colorado State Register of Historic Properties
Houses on the National Register of Historic Places in Colorado
Houses completed in 1889
History of Denver
Victorian architecture in Colorado
Richardsonian Romanesque architecture in Colorado
Queen Anne architecture in Colorado
Houses in Denver
National Register of Historic Places in Denver